Kirklin Township is one of fourteen townships in Clinton County, Indiana. As of the 2010 census, its population was 1,380 and it contained 556 housing units.

History
The township was organized in 1837 from a piece of Jackson Township and named for Nathan Kirk, a local pioneer and the first settler in the eastern half of the county.  Arriving in 1826, Kirk erected a log cabin in section 34 on the eastern side of what was known as Twelve Mile Prairie and remained the only white resident of the area that would become Kirklin Township until 1829, when Thaddeus Panburn and Daniel Hunter came and entered his employ.

Sugar Creek Township was set off from a piece of Kirklin Township in 1841.  The Monon Railroad, arriving in 1883, was the first rail line to pass through the township and led to the founding of the town of Cyclone.

Geography

Cities and towns
 Kirklin

Adjacent townships
 Michigan Township (north)
 Johnson Township (northeast)
 Sugar Creek Township (east)
 Marion Township, Boone County (southeast)
 Clinton Township, Boone County (southwest)
 Jackson Township (west)
 Center Township (northwest)

Major highways
  U.S. Route 421
  Indiana State Road 38

Cemeteries
The township contains six cemeteries: Bogan, Dew, Earp, Kings Corner, McIntire, Oak Hill and Stowers.

References
 
 United States Census Bureau cartographic boundary files

Townships in Clinton County, Indiana
Townships in Indiana
1837 establishments in Indiana